KaVontae Turpin (born August 2, 1996) is an American football wide receiver for the Dallas Cowboys of the National Football League (NFL). He played college football at TCU before joining the second iteration of the New Jersey Generals for the 2022 USFL season. On June 22, 2022, Turpin was awarded MVP for the USFL. Turpin also played in the European League of Football for the Wroclaw Panthers from Poland in 2021.

Early years
Turpin went to Neville High School in his home town Monroe, Louisiana. As a senior, he totaled 1,928 all-purpose yards, including 904 rushing and 724 receiving, and 29 touchdowns. He received All-state, All-Northeast Louisiana and All-NELA Big School Offensive Player of the Year honors.

He was a three-star recruit and no. 12 prospect from all of Louisiana. On January 25, 2015, Turpin committed to TCU over another scholarship offer from Texas Tech.

He also played varsity basketball as a guard, averaging 12.9 points per game between his junior and senior years.

College career

2015 season
Turpin accepted a football scholarship from Texas Christian University. As a true freshman, he started in five of 13 games. On October 5, he was named Big 12 Co-Offensive Player of the Week, after posting career-best totals of 6 receptions for 138 yards and four receiving touchdowns in the Horned Frogs' 50-7 win over the University of Texas. The four touchdown receptions were the most by a freshman in Big 12 history. He injured his neck/shoulder in the seventh game against Iowa State University and missed the remainder of the contest.

He had 7 receptions for 107 yards and one touchdown in the ninth game against Oklahoma State University. In the twelfth game against Baylor University, he made a game-winning 8-yard catch in the second overtime. He finished the season with 45 receptions (freshman school record), 649 receiving yards (freshman school record), 8 receiving touchdowns (freshman school record), 1,675 all-purpose yards (led the team) and averaged 15.3 yards every time he touched the ball.

He was second in the Big 12 and tied for 14th nationally with his 27-yard average in kickoff returns, the highest mark by a Horned Frog since Greg McCoy in 2011 (30.6). He was the only player in the nation to rank in the top 25 in both kickoff returns and punt returns. He was named freshman All-American by the FWAA and honorable-mention All-Big 12 selection as a return specialist.

2016 season
As a sophomore, he was limited with injuries, appearing in eight games while registering 30 receptions for 295 yards and one receiving touchdown. He averaged 16.2 yards on punt returns and 30.8 on kickoff returns. He was one of five players nationally with a punt return and kickoff return for a touchdown. On September 6, he was named the Big 12 Special Teams Player of the Week after having an 81-yard punt return for a touchdown (sixth longest in school history) in the season opener against South Dakota State while also having 7 receptions for 62 yards, 177 all-purpose yards (82 punt returns, 62 receiving, 33 rushing).

On September 12, he was named the Big 12 Special Teams Player of the Week after totaling 169 return yards (33 punt, 136 kickoff), including a career-long 64-yard kickoff return with less than a minute to play in the game to put the offense in position for a potential game-winning field goal, while also tying a career high with seven receptions for 126 yards and having a career-high best 295 all-purpose yards (136 kickoff returns, 33 punt returns, 126 receiving). His 90-yard punt return for a score in the sixth game against the University of Kansas, tied for the second-longest in school history.

2017 season
As a junior, he appeared in all 14 games with three starts, registering 41 receptions for 394 yards, one receiving touchdown and 1,202 all-purpose yards. He returned a punt for a touchdown in win over the University of Kansas, returned a kickoff for a touchdown against Iowa State University and threw a touchdown in a win over West Virginia University, becoming only the fifth player in the previous 10 seasons with that stat line.

He was named Big 12 Special Teams Player of the Week against the University of Kansas for returning three punts for 95 yards and a touchdown. He was named first-team All-Big 12 kick and punt returner, a first-team AP All-Big 12 (all-purpose), honorable-mention All-Big 12 as a wide receiver and honorable-mention Big 12 Special Teams Player of the Year.

2018 season
As a senior, he played the entire season with a warrant out for his arrest from failure to appear to a domestic violence charge in New Mexico.  Gary Patterson and the TCU Coaching staff were aware of the spring break arrest, but failed to investigate the matter further and claim they had no knowledge of the outstanding warrant.  He was second on the team in receptions (29), receiving yards (410) and receiving touchdowns (three). He also returned a kickoff and a punt for touchdowns, and his punt-return average of 19.4 yards per attempt tied for the FBS lead. On September 10, he was named the Big 12 Special Teams Player of the Week, after having a 78-yard punt return for a touchdown, making it the fourth of his career and a school record. On October 9, he returned a kickoff for a 98-yard touchdown against the University of Oklahoma, making it his sixth career return (four punts, two kickoffs) for a touchdown, which was also a school record.

On October 23, he was dismissed from the team for two domestic violence charges. At the time, he was leading the nation by averaging almost 20 yards per punt return.

He finished his college career as arguably the school's greatest returner: His four punt returns for a touchdown and six career special teams touchdowns were the most in TCU history.

College statistics

Professional career

Frisco Fighters (IFL)
In 2019, he was ruled ineligible to participate in TCU's Pro Day, forcing him to hold his own workout, where he put up a 40-yard dash time of 4.31 seconds. After not being selected in the 2019 NFL Draft and not getting an opportunity in two years because of his off-the-field issues, Turpin signed with the Frisco Fighters of the IFL in 2020. However he never played a game with the team, as the season was canceled due to the COVID-19 pandemic.

FCF Glacier Boyz
Turpin joined the FCF Glacier Boyz for the 2021 inaugural season. He posted 13 receptions for 223 yards and 4 receiving touchdowns over the 6 game season.

TSL Sea Lions
In 2021, he signed with the Sea Lions of The Spring League. He appeared in 6 games and was tied for second on the league with 3 receiving touchdowns.

Panthers Wrocław (ELF)
In August 2021 season, the Panthers Wrocław of the European League of Football based in Poland, signed him mid-season as replacement for injured running back Mark Herndon. There he won 3 out of 4 regular season games with an important win over the Hamburg Sea Devils, where he registered 293 yards of total offense and two touchdowns. He finished the regular season with 702 all-purpose yards and six touchdowns. In the semi-final on the road, Turpin and the Panthers lost 27 to 30 in a close game against the Sea Devils. On November 2, the franchise re-signed him for the 2022 season, but he instead opted to be eligible for the draft of the newly founded USFL.

New Jersey Generals (USFL)
Turpin was selected by the New Jersey Generals in the 13th round (103rd overall) of the 2022 USFL Draft. He appeared in 10 games, making 44 receptions for 540 yards (led the league), 4 receiving touchdowns (second in the league), 23 carries for 129 yards, one rushing touchdown, 921 all-purpose yards, 12 punt returns for 184 yards and one touchdown. He was named the league MVP of the inaugural USFL season.

Dallas Cowboys
On July 27, 2022, Turpin signed a three-year contract with the Dallas Cowboys of the NFL.

On August 20, 2022, in the second pre-season game played at SoFi Stadium against the Los Angeles Chargers, Turpin scored two touchdowns: the first on a 98-yard kickoff return in the first quarter and the second on an 86-yard punt return in the second quarter, thus paving the way for a 32–18 Cowboys victory. Turpin also added 1 rush attempt for 7 yards during the game. 

Turpin was active for all 17 games during the regular season and both games during the postseason. He finished the regular season with 1 catch for 9 yards, 3 rush attempts for 17 yards, and 508 kick return yards as well as 303 punt return yards. In the postseason, Turpin added 1 catch for 8 yards, 155 kick return yards, and 7 punt return yards to those totals.

Professional Statistics

Personal life
In 2019, Turpin pleaded guilty in a second family violence case against his former girlfriend which occurred in October 2018. He was cut from the TCU football program by Gary Patterson shortly after he was informed of this second battery charge against him. Despite Gary Patterson and the TCU Coaching staff knowing about his previous assault, he was allowed to continue to play throughout the 2018 season until he committed the second offense against the same woman. As part of his plea agreement, he served two years' deferred adjudication probation and completed a 27-week Partner Abuse Intervention Program.

Notes

References

External links
TCU Horned Frogs bio
Dallas Cowboys bio
ELF bio
USFL bio

1996 births
Living people
American football wide receivers
Players of American football from Louisiana
Panthers Wrocław players
American expatriate players of American football
Dallas Cowboys players
TCU Horned Frogs football players
National Conference Pro Bowl players
New Jersey Generals (2022) players
American expatriate sportspeople in Poland